Joseph Charles Grzenda (June 8, 1937 – July 12, 2019) was an American professional baseball relief pitcher. He played in Major League Baseball (MLB) for eight seasons (1961; 1964–1967; 1969–1972) for the Detroit Tigers, Kansas City Athletics, New York Mets, Minnesota Twins, Washington Senators and St. Louis Cardinals. His professional career lasted for 20 seasons (1955–1974) and included 492 appearances in the minor leagues.

Career 
Grzenda was a left-handed sidearm pitcher who pitched in 219 Major League games, all but three games as a relief pitcher. His best season statistics-wise was in 1971 for the Washington Senators, when he earned five victories with an excellent 1.92 earned run average (ERA). All told, he posted a 14–13 won–lost record and an even 4.00 earned run average in the big leagues, with 14 saves. In 308 innings pitched, he surrendered 323 hits and 120 bases on balls, and notched 173 strikeouts.

Not known for his hitting ability, Grzenda once grounded out to third base in RFK Stadium and received a standing ovation. On September 30, 1971, he became the last pitcher in the franchise's tenure at Washington, D.C., getting two outs in the top of the ninth inning before fans, knowing the team would be leaving for Dallas–Fort Worth after the season to become the Texas Rangers, stormed the RFK Stadium field, causing a forfeit. Thirty-four years later, when baseball returned to the nation's capital, Grzenda returned to the RFK field before the Washington Nationals' first home game, handing George W. Bush the ball he would use to throw out the first pitch.

As a fielder, Grzenda was charged with no errors during his eight-year career for a perfect 1.000 fielding percentage (6 putouts, 66 assists). In 1969 he made an appearance in the ALCS for the Minnesota Twins.

Grzenda died at his home in Covington Township, Pennsylvania on July 12, 2019.

References

External links

1937 births
2019 deaths
American expatriate baseball players in Canada
American people of Polish descent
Baseball players from Pennsylvania
Birmingham A's players
Birmingham Barons players
Charleston Senators players
Denver Bears players
Detroit Tigers players
Durham Bulls players
Jamestown Falcons players
Johnson City Cardinals players
Kansas City Athletics players
Major League Baseball pitchers
Minnesota Twins players
Mobile A's players
New York Mets players
Oklahoma City 89ers players
Richmond Braves players
St. Louis Cardinals players
Sportspeople from Scranton, Pennsylvania
Syracuse Chiefs players
Tulsa Oilers (baseball) players
Valdosta Tigers players
Vancouver Mounties players
Victoria Rosebuds players
Washington Senators (1961–1971) players
Winnipeg Goldeyes players